The women's 3000 metres steeplechase event at the 2009 Summer Universiade was held on 8–10 July.

Medalists

Results

Heats
Qualification: First 4 of each heat (Q) and the next 4 fastest (q) qualified for the final.

Final

References

Results (archived)

3000
2009 in women's athletics
2009